Joseph or Joe Haynes may refer to:

Joseph Haynes (painter) (1760–1829), English etcher and engraver
Joseph E. Haynes (1827–1897), mayor of Newark, New Jersey
Joe Haynes (baseball) (1917–1967), American baseball player, coach and executive
Joe M. Haynes (1936–2018), Tennessee politician

See also

Joe Haines (disambiguation)